Toxonotus cornutus is a species of fungus weevil in the beetle family Anthribidae. It is found in Central America, North America, and Oceania.

References

Further reading

External links

 

Anthribidae
Articles created by Qbugbot
Beetles described in 1831